Cycle Toronto is a Canadian cycling advocacy and charity organization based in Toronto, Ontario. Founded in 2008 as the Toronto Cyclists Union, the group adopted its current name in 2012 and became a registered charity in 2021. Cycle Toronto host public education and safety workshops, organizes cycling events, and publishes the Toronto Cycling Handbook.

History
A number of cycling activists had talked about starting an advocacy and lobbying organization for Toronto over the years, similar to the Active Transportation Alliance in Chicago or Transportation Alternatives in New York City. In 2007, David Meslin did a research trip of cycling advocacy organizations across North America and returned with a presentation. Toronto cycling activists soon began the organizing work of forming the Toronto Cyclists Union, a membership-based cycling advocacy group, which launched as the Toronto Cyclists Union in 2008.

At the organization's 2012 annual general meeting (AGM), members voted in favour of a motion put forward by the Board of Directors to change the name of the organization to Cycle Toronto.

In April 2021, Cycle Toronto announced that they had become a charity.

See also
 Advocacy for Respect for Cyclists
 Cycling in Toronto
 Toronto Bicycling Network

References

External links
 

Organizations based in Toronto
Cycling organizations in Canada
Cycling in Toronto
Non-profit organizations based in Toronto
Charities based in Canada